Bankan Tey Dogon, at first called Walo-Kumbe Dogon after the two main villages it is spoken in, also known as Walo and Walonkore, is a divergent, recently described Dogon language spoken in Mali. It was first reported online by Roger Blench, who reports that it is "clearly related to Nanga", which is only known from one report from 1953.

A third village investigated at the time, Been, speaks a related but lexically distinct form, Ben Tey Dogon.

References

Sources
 .

External links
Walo–Kumbe wordlist (Dendo and Blench, 2005)

Dogon languages
Languages of Mali